Lebid is a surname meaning "swan" in Ukrainian. It may refer to:
 Anatoliy Lebid (born 1944), Soviet footballer
 Mykola Lebid (1936–2007), Ukrainian painter
 Serhiy Lebid (born 1975), Ukrainian long-distance runner

See also
 
 Lebed (surname)

Ukrainian-language surnames